Hertsmere Borough Council elects all its councillors on a four-year cycle, with the next elections in 2023. Since the last boundary changes in 1999, 39 councillors have been elected from 15 wards.

Political control
Since the foundation of the council in 1973 political control of the council has been held by the following parties:

Leadership
The leaders of the council since 1999 have been:

Council elections
1973 Hertsmere District Council election
1976 Hertsmere District Council election (New ward boundaries)
1979 Hertsmere Borough Council election
1980 Hertsmere Borough Council election
1982 Hertsmere Borough Council election
1983 Hertsmere Borough Council election
1984 Hertsmere Borough Council election
1986 Hertsmere Borough Council election
1987 Hertsmere Borough Council election
1988 Hertsmere Borough Council election
1990 Hertsmere Borough Council election
1991 Hertsmere Borough Council election
1992 Hertsmere Borough Council election
1994 Hertsmere Borough Council election (Borough boundary changes took place but the number of seats remained the same)
1995 Hertsmere Borough Council election
1996 Hertsmere Borough Council election
1998 Hertsmere Borough Council election
1999 Hertsmere Borough Council election (New ward boundaries)
2000 Hertsmere Borough Council election
2002 Hertsmere Borough Council election
2003 Hertsmere Borough Council election
2004 Hertsmere Borough Council election
2006 Hertsmere Borough Council election
2007 Hertsmere Borough Council election
2008 Hertsmere Borough Council election
2010 Hertsmere Borough Council election
2011 Hertsmere Borough Council election
2012 Hertsmere Borough Council election
2014 Hertsmere Borough Council election
2015 Hertsmere Borough Council election
2019 Hertsmere Borough Council election (New ward boundaries)

Borough result maps

By-election results

Jeremy Newmark was the Labour Party candidate for the seat of Finchley & Golders Green at the 2017 General Election.

References

 By-election results

External links
Hertsmere Borough Council

 
Politics of Hertsmere
Council elections in Hertfordshire
Hertsmere